The Rapture Tour is a concert tour and the first headlining tour by American recording artist Anita Baker in support of her second studio album Rapture (1986). The tour started in mid-March 1986, visiting several cities throughout North America and Europe. In 1987, Baker kicked off a North America second leg trek, which included seven dates in Los Angeles at the Beverly Theatre in January, including two and three-night dates in Merrillville, Indiana, New York City and Miami, Florida. The outing included four sold-out shows scheduled in Washington D.C. and three consecutive dates for the second visit in Merrillville, Indiana.

Concert synopsis
The tour consisted of a selection of songs from Baker's 1983 debut, The Songstress and the majority of the Rapture album. For each performance, Baker would perform songs from both albums, and also include a song from other artists. For example, she performed "You've Changed" by Sarah Vaughan for one show, and Van Morrison's "Moondance" for another. She performed several shows throughout the week in Los Angeles, with gospel/R&B group the Perri Sisters joining as background vocals and toured with Baker for the remainder of the tour.

The Band
Music Director: Bobby Lyle
Guitar: Donald Griffin
Keyboards: Bobby Lyle
Percussions: Garry Glenn
Saxophone: Gerald Albright
Bass: Nathan East
Drums: James Bradley, Jr
Backing vocalists (1986): Tanya Boyd, Saundra Simmons, and Natalie Jackson
Backing vocalists (1987): Perri Sisters, Gina Taylor, and Freida Williams

Opening acts
Perri Sisters 
Pieces of a Dream 
Durell Coleman 
Rhonda Hansome 
Nat Augustin 
Tease 
The Controllers 
The Rose Brothers

Setlist
The following setlist was obtained from the concert held on January 2, 1987, at the Beverly Theatre in Los Angeles, California. It does not represent all concerts for the duration of the tour. 
"Caught Up in the Rapture"
"Will You Be Mine"
"Angel"
"Mystery"
"Stop to Love"
"You're the Best Thing Yet"
"Same Ole Love (365 Days a Year)"
"You Bring Me Joy"
"Watch Your Step"
"Sweet Love
"No One in the World"
"Been So Long"
"No More Tears"
"Blessed"

Notes
*The concert on July 16, in Montreux, Switzerland, she performed Van Morrison's song "Moondance".

Tour dates

Festivals and other miscellaneous performances
This concert was a part of the "JVC Jazz Festival"
This concert was a part of the "Montreux Jazz Festival"
This concert was a part of the "Miller Genuine Draft Concerts at Jones Beach"

Cancellations and rescheduled shows

Box office score data

VHS/DVD/CD release

A DVD and CD Live Collection, entitled A Night Of Rapture: Live was released in 2004 by Rhino Records, which reached #35 in the Billboard 'Top R&B/Hip-Hop albums' list.

Track listing
 Caught Up in the Rapture – 5:29
 Mystery – 5:24
 Been So Long – 5:52
 No One in the World – 4:11
 Same Ole Love (365 Days a Year) – 3:59
 Watch Your Step – 6:20
 Moondance – 4:08
 You Bring Me Joy – 4:32
 Sweet Love – 7:20
 Sweet Love [Multimedia Track]
 You Bring Me Joy [Multimedia Track]
 No One in the World [Multimedia Track]

External links
www.anitabaker.com
Description at Rhino Records' website

References

1986 concert tours
1987 concert tours
Anita Baker concert tours

es:The Rapture Tour
fr:The Rapture Tour
nl:The Rapture Tour